Monok is a village in Borsod-Abaúj-Zemplén, Hungary and is part of the Tokaj wine region.

Geography

The Zemplén Mountains have two sides: on the north Vilvitány Hill, on the south Szerencs Hill. The village lies in the valley between the two. 

On the north and south slopes there are fields and vineyards whose wines compete with those  from Tokaj, and the fields bordering the vineyards offer views of the Tatra Mountains.

History
It is not certain when the village was established, but it was some time during the Mongol invasion of Europe, or the earlier Hungarian invasion.

The first record of the village is in 1392 and the Monok family owned it from the mid 13th century until the mid 17th century. The name of the village allegedly comes from Slavic monoh meaning "monk". During the Ottoman Empire the village was razed and in 1567 it was recorded as being just barren fields. Towards the end of this century the village was reinhabited and around 1570 a small castle was built in the Renaissance style. Later, the village was owned by the Andrássy family who renovated the castle, but because it was too small they built another nearby in the Classical style.

Ethnicity

93% of the population is Hungarian, with the remaining 7% being of Romany origin.

Traditions
 Monok holds a  summer fair on the second Sunday of every September  called  fair, to which people from far and wide make a pilgrimage.
 Each August the renovated Monaky Castle holds a "Renaissance Castle Day", when people wear period dress and perform archery and stage marionette shows. There is also a market and a beer tent, which also serves cauldrons of goulash and soft drinks.

Landmarks

 Lajos Kossuth's birthplace
 Andrássy Castle
 Renaissance Castle (small)
 War memorials
 Kálvária fairground
 Roman Catholic church, renovated in 2005
 Lake Ingvár
 Many old houses with verandas in several architectural styles
 Szécheny family mausoleum.

Notable people
 Lajos Kossuth, leader of Hungary, was born in Monok on 19 September 1802
 Miklós Németh, Hungarian Prime Minister, was born in Monok on 24 January 1948
 János Holup, sport shooter

References

External links
 Edit Tamás: Monok (in Hungarian)
 European Wine Routes website (in Hungarian)
 Aerial photographs of Monok (in Hungarian)
 Association of Castles of Upper Hungary – Monok (in Hungarian)
 Monok – Portal (in Hungarian)

 Street map at terkepcentrum.hu (in Hungarian)

Populated places in Borsod-Abaúj-Zemplén County